The 2014 Vuelta a España was the 69th edition of the Vuelta a España, one of cycling's Grand Tours. The Vuelta a España features 198 riders competing from 22 cycling teams; the race took place from 23 August to 14 September 2014, starting in Jerez de la Frontera and finishing in Santiago de Compostela.

Teams
All eighteen UCI ProTeams were automatically invited and were obliged to attend the race. In April 2014, four UCI Professional Continental teams were given wildcard places into the race, to complete a 22-team peloton. 's inclusion in the race was the first instance of an African-licensed team appearing at a Grand Tour.

The 22 teams that competed in the race were:

 
 
 
 
 *
 
 *
 
 
 
 
 *
 
 
 
 
 *
 
 
 
 
 

*: Pro Continental teams given wild card entry to this event.

By rider

The list of riders at the start of the race was:

By nationality
The 198 riders that competed in the 2014 Vuelta a España represented 34 different countries.

References

External links
 

2014 Vuelta a España
2014